The 1st Expeditionary Force of the Ottoman Empire was one of the expeditionary forces of the Ottoman Army.

Order of battle
In December 1914, the 1st Expeditionary Force was structured as follows:

1st Expeditionary Force HQ (commander: Kaymakam Kâzım Karabekir Bey)
7th Infantry Regiment (3rd Division, İzmit)
9th Infantry Regiment (3rd Division, Adapazarı)
44th Infantry Regiment (15th Division, Kayseri)
3rd Battalion (Mountain Howitzer) (4th Artillery Regiment, Edirne)
4th Artillery Regiment

References

General references

Expeditionary Forces of the Ottoman Empire
Military units and formations of the Ottoman Empire in World War I